The Western Passage is an inlet off of the Bay of Fundy just north of Eastport, Maine.

Landforms of Charlotte County, New Brunswick
Bodies of water of New Brunswick
Bodies of water of Washington County, Maine
Inlets of Canada
Bodies of water of Maine
Inlets of Maine